Rekun (also Romanized as Rekūn) is a village in Pazevar Rural District, Rudbast District, Babolsar County, Mazandaran Province, Iran. At the 2006 census, its population was 193, in 49 families.

References 

Populated places in Babolsar County